Ho is a village in southwestern Jutland in the Varde Municipality, in Region of Southern Denmark. Many tourists, especially Germans, visit the village primarily because of the nature of the area. It is 7 kilometers from Blåvand, 11 kilometers from Oksbøl and 32 from Esbjerg.

Etymology 
Ho is linked to Ho Bugt. Ho is derived from Hõi, which means trough or cart. Ho can therefore be translated into "the fjord that looks like a trough".

See also
List of short place names

Bibliography

References 

Cities and towns in the Region of Southern Denmark
Varde Municipality